Lydia is an unincorporated community in Wichita County, Kansas, United States.  It is located between Leoti and Lakin.

History
A post office was opened in Lydia in 1888, and remained in operation until it was discontinued in 1928.

References

Further reading

External links
 Wichita County maps: Current, Historic, KDOT

Unincorporated communities in Wichita County, Kansas
Unincorporated communities in Kansas